Hannah England (born 6 March 1987) is a British middle-distance running athlete who specialised in the 800 metres, 1500 metres and mile run. At 1500 m, she is the 2011 World Championship silver medallist and finished fourth at the 2013 World Championships. She also competed at the 2012 Olympic Games in London. England is one of only five British women in history (as of 2019) to have run under two minutes for 800 m and nine minutes for 3000 m, the others being Christina Boxer, Kirsty Wade, Jessica Judd and Laura Muir. She announced her retirement from athletics on 14 January 2020.

Biography
Born in Oxford, England, she attended the Cherwell School in Summertown, North Oxford. England joined Oxford City Athletic Club as an under 13, her first major success coming in the UK Athletics Reebok Cross Country Challenge in Birmingham as an Under 15. In 2005 England joined Birmingham University to study Biochemistry. Winning the national junior title in the 1500 m and competing at the World Junior Championships. As part of her degree studies, she spent a year at Florida State University. During her time there, she competed for the university's track team at the NCAA Track and Field Championships, winning the mile run indoors and the 1500 m outdoors. She returned to the United Kingdom and finished third in the 1500 m at the 2008 national championships. However, World Junior Champion Stephanie Twell was selected ahead of her for the 2008 Summer Olympics and England attended the Games as a reserve but did not compete.

The following season she competed in the 1500 m at the 2009 European Athletics Indoor Championships, but did not progress beyond the heats after a below-par performance. She set a personal best of 4:05.87 at the Fanny Blankers-Koen Games in Hengelo, finishing seventh and beating Olympic champion Nancy Lagat. England set an 800 m personal best of 1:59.94 at the 2009 European Team Championships and managed fourth place in both 800 and 1500 metres events, helping the Great Britain team to a third-place finish.

Qualification for the 2009 World Championships in the 1500 metres was going to be hard, as four British athletes had achieved the time required, but only three entrants per event were allowed. As Charlene Thomas surprisingly won the British trials, she was selected by default. Lisa Dobriskey, who had finished 4th at the Beijing Olympics the previous year and was still in good form, was also selected on merit; the last remaining place was between England and Stephanie Twell. As Twell had a faster time that season, as well as higher youth achievement, she was selected over England. Dobriskey went on to win a silver medal at the World Championships.

At the 2009 IAAF World Athletics Final, England qualified for 1500 metres as one of the top twelve athletes of the season. She finished second in the race, behind only Olympic Champion Nancy Jebet Lagat and beating among others reigning World Champion Maryam Yusuf Jamal.

In 2010 England finished a strong second in the 1500m at the European Team Championships in Bergen, Norway and followed it up with a national AAA title, again at 1500m, to secure selection for the European Championships in Barcelona running a startling 56.7 last lap, albeit in a very slow race.

On 1 September 2011 at the IAAF World Athletics Championship, competing in the 1500m final, Hannah produced a stunning final 100 metres, coming from 7th place at the final bend to take the Silver medal in a time of 4:05.68.

Personal
She is the daughter of Oxford geophysicist, Professor Philip England and in 2012 she married fellow Great Britain athlete Luke Gunn.

International competitions

National titles
UK Championships 1500 m (2010, 2011, 2013)
UK Indoor Championships 3000 m (2012)
NCAA Championships 1500 m (2008)
NCAA Indoor Championships 1500 m (2008)

Personal bests

References

External links

 Official Facebook Fan Page
Interview with Kelly Holmes
"How Kelly Holmes helped me reach the top" Spikes Mag article

1987 births
Living people
Sportspeople from Oxford
British female long-distance runners
English female long-distance runners
British female middle-distance runners
English female middle-distance runners
Olympic female middle-distance runners
Olympic athletes of Great Britain
Athletes (track and field) at the 2012 Summer Olympics
Commonwealth Games competitors for England
Athletes (track and field) at the 2010 Commonwealth Games
Athletes (track and field) at the 2014 Commonwealth Games
World Athletics Championships athletes for Great Britain
World Athletics Championships medalists
British Athletics Championships winners
Alumni of the University of Birmingham
Florida State Seminoles women's track and field athletes
Florida State University alumni